Charles Dunn (December 28, 1799April 7, 1872) was an American lawyer and judge. He was the only Chief Justice of the Supreme Court of the Wisconsin Territory.  After Wisconsin became a state he served four years in the Wisconsin State Senate. He is the namesake of Dunn County, Wisconsin.

Biography

Born in Bullitt's Lick, Bullitt County, Kentucky, Dunn was educated in Kentucky and Illinois. Dunn read law under Nathaniel Pope in Illinois and was admitted to the Illinois bar. During the Black Hawk War of 1832, Dunn served in the Illinois Militia. Dunn served as the clerk of the Illinois House of Representatives and was elected to serve in the Illinois House.

In 1836, President Andrew Jackson appointed Dunn to the Wisconsin Territorial Supreme Court and he served as chief justice of the court until Wisconsin was admitted to the union on May 29, 1848. Among other cases, Dunn presided at Mineral Point in the murder trial of William Caffey in 1842. Caffey was defended by Moses R. Strong, and despite a colorable self-defence plea, Caffey was convicted and hanged near the spot where the railroad station later would stand. It is said to be the last hanging in Wisconsin, and Caffey's ghost is said to frequent the nearby Walker House hotel.

Dunn served in the second Wisconsin Constitutional Convention of 1847–1848 and helped draft the judiciary article in the Wisconsin Constitution of 1848. Dunn served in the Wisconsin State Senate from 1853 to 1856. In 1858, Dunn ran for the United States House of Representatives and lost. Dunn then resumed his law practice, settling and living in Belmont, Wisconsin, for the rest of his life.

Family and legacy

Charles Dunn married Mary E. Shrader in 1821.  They had at least six children, but only two survived to adulthood.  Their daughter Catherine married Nelson Dewey, the first Governor of Wisconsin, during his first term as governor.

Dunn County, Wisconsin, was named in his honor.

Notes

External links

People from Bullitt County, Kentucky
People from Grant County, Wisconsin
American people of the Black Hawk War
Wisconsin Territory judges
19th-century American judges
Members of the Illinois House of Representatives
Wisconsin state senators
1799 births
1872 deaths
Dunn County, Wisconsin
People from Belmont, Wisconsin
19th-century American politicians